A number of elections on the local level took place in Mexico during 2007.

Local elections